Intelligence & Ignorance is the fourth studio album by Ed O.G. It was released on February 5, 2013, through Envision Entertainment. The album features guest appearances by Freestyle (of Arsonists) and Noel Gourdin with the production from Oh No, Cam Bluff, Max Mostley, Microphono and RMG.

Track listing

References

2013 albums
Ed O.G. albums